This is the list of tourist attractions in Selangor, Malaysia.

Galleries
 Sultan Abdul Aziz Royal Gallery

Historical buildings
 Kris Monument
 One Fathom Bank Lighthouse

Memorials
 Nirvana Memorial Park

Museums
 Petaling Jaya Museum
 Sultan Alam Shah Museum

Nature
 Ampang Recreational Forest
 Ampang River
 Ayer Hitam Forest Reserve
 Bagan Lalang Beach
 Batu Caves
 Bukit Melawati
 Carey Island
 Chiling Waterfalls
 Damansara River
 Forest Research Institute Malaysia
 Gabai Falls
 Gombak River
 Kampung Kuantan
 Kanching Waterfalls
 Ketam Island
 Klang Island
 Padang Balang
 Klang River
 Kota Damansara Community Forest Park
 Kuala Selangor Nature Park
 Langat River
 Morib Beach
 Mount Nuang
 National Botanical Garden Shah Alam
 Penchala River
 Selangor River
 Selangor State Park
 Seri Kundang Blue Lake
 Tabur Hill
 Templer's Park

Religious places

Mosque
 Selangor State Mosque

Temple
 Wat Chetawan
 Fo Guang Shan Dong Zen Temple (佛光山東禪寺)
 Kau Ong Yah Lam Thian Kiong Temple (安邦南天宮)
 Batu Caves

Sport centres
 Sepang International Circuit
 Shah Alam Stadium

Shopping centres
 1 Utama
 ÆON Bukit Tinggi Shopping Centre
 Empire Subang
 Jaya Supermarket
 Klang Parade
 Mines Wellness City
 Subang Parade
 Sunway Pyramid
 The Curve
 Tropicana City Mall
 Melawati Mall

Theatres
 Shah Alam Royale Theatre

Theme parks
 Sunway Lagoon
 WetLand
 Mines Resort City

Towns
 i-City
 Sasaran
 Batu Arang
 Tanjung Sepat

Transportation
 Kuala Lumpur International Airport
 Kuala Lumpur International Airport 2

Zoo
 National Zoo of Malaysia

Closed attractions
 Safari Lagoon Waterpark

See also
 List of tourist attractions in Malaysia

References

 
Tourism in Malaysia
Selangor